Remy Chauvin (10 October 1913 – 8 December 2009) at Sainte-Croix-aux-Mines, Haut-Rhin, was a biologist and entomologist, and a French Honorary Professor Emeritus at the Sorbonne, PhD, and a senior research fellow since 1946. Chauvin was also known for defending the rights of animals and for being interested in such topics as parapsychology, life after death, psychics, clairvoyance and the phenomenon of UFOs. He sometimes wrote under the pseudonym Pierre Duval.

Evolution 
Chauvin, continuing a tradition defended by French scientists Pierre-Paul Grassé and Jean Piveteau, was very critical of Darwinism and sociobiology. He developed his own evolutionary theory which was described in three books (God of the ants, God of the stars; The Biology of the Spirit; Darwinism or the death of a myth)

Chauvin's view of evolution can be seen as directed, goal driven and non-random.  He has been described as a non-darwinian evolutionist. The following is a summary of his evolutionary views:
 Neo-Darwinism is a set of tautologies (e.g. natural selection predicts the survival of the fittest. But who is the fittest? Whoever survives!).
 Life is characterized by an immense adaptability to extensive changes in environments.
 The narrowness of the adaptation is death (e.g. a panda eats only bamboo).
 Alongside a complicated device, you can often find one nearby that is simpler and apparently works as well.
 Evolution looks at the goal and not the means.
 The environment is selective in only a very small number of cases.
 Evolution is directed.  It is an internal program that runs and does not return. The goal seems to be the highest possible psyche.

Similar to the parapsychologist Helmut Schmidt Chauvin developed some of his views from his experiments in Anpsi (animal psi).  He did experiments with rats and his results indicated that the rats could have been using Extrasensory perception.

Chauvin has been the subject of much criticism from others because it would appear his views of evolution have a vitalist leaning. He was also accused by his critics of wanting to strengthen creationism, although Chauvin was not a creationist.

Chauvin wrote a number of books on parapsychology that were similar to books by the authors Jacques Bergier and Louis Pauwels.

Published works by Chauvin 
Most of Chauvin's works have been published in French. The translations into English are listed here:
 The life of the insect and physiology, ed.  Lechevalier, 1941, repr.  1983
 What you should know about the life of the insect physiology and biology, ed.  Lechevalier, 1943
 Treaty of Insect Physiology: the major functions, behavior, environmental physiology, ed.  INRA, 1949, repr.  1958
 Five years of operation of the station Bee Research Bures-sur-Yvette, ed.  INRA, 1954
 Life and habits of insects, ed.  Payot, 1956
 Bee biology.  General review until 1956, ed.  INRA, vol.  1, 1958
 God of scholars, the experience of God, ed.  Mame, 1958
 Social behavior in animals, ed.  PUF, 1961
 Animal societies, from bee to gorilla, ed.  Plon, 1963
 Fighting techniques in animals, ed.  Hachette, coll.  The Adventure of Life, 1965
 Our unknown powers (under the pseudonym Pierre Duval, Jacques + Bergier), ed.  Planet (Planet Encyclopedia coll.), 1966, repr.  CGR (and revised), 1997
 The world of insects, ed.  Hachette, 1967
 Behavior (+ Canestrelli L.), ed.  Masson, 1968, ed.  PUF, 1968
 The world of ants, ed.  Plon, 1969, repr.  du Rocher 1994, supplemented
 Science to the strange (under the pseudonym Pierre Duval), ed.  Club of Friends of the Book (CAL – al. Library of irrationality and of the great mysteries), 1973
 Attachment (+ Anzieu D.), ed.  Oxford University Press, 1974
 Ethology, biological study of animal behavior, ed.  PUF, 1975
 Gifted, ed.  Stock, 1975 repr.  Marabout, 1979
 From the heart, ed.  Retz, 1976
 Some things I do not understand, ed.  CELT, 1976, repr.  Famot, 1982 (revised edition of "Science at the strange")
 The bees and I, ed.  Hachette, 1976
 The animal world and its complex behaviors (+ Bernadette Chauvin), ed.  Plon, 1977
 The challenges of future war, ed.  France-Empire, 1978
 Ants and Men, ed.  France-Empire, 1979
 The synod of the faithful, ed.  Vernoy, 1979
 Secrets of portolans (maps of the unknown), ed.  France-Empire, 1980
 Parapsychology.  When the irrational joined Science, ed.  Hachette, 1980
 Scholars, for what?, Ed.  Payot, 1981
 Plot in our church, ed.  du Rocher, 1981 (idem "The Synod of the faithful", less the introduction, plus an afterword and a conclusion)
 The animal model (+ Bernadette Chauvin), ed.  Hachette, 1982
 Animal societies, ed.  PUF, 1982, repr.  Quadriga / PUF, 1999
 Travel Overseas Land, ed.  du Rocher, 1983
 The watchmen of the time, ed.  du Rocher, 1984
 Animal societies and human societies, 1984, PUF, coll.  " What do I know? "No. 696 (note: QSJ with same title and same number, by Paul Chauchard)
 The biology of mind, ed.  du Rocher, 1985
 The hive and man, ed.  Calmann-Lévy, 1987
 God of the ants, the god of the stars, ed.  The Pre Clerics, 1988
 The direction of life and the genesis of thought, ed.  François-Xavier de Guibert, 1989, repr.  EYE 1998
 Animals and men, ed.  Seghers, 1989
 The animal instinct, ed.  Contrasts / The zeitgeist, 1990 (first part of Charles Darwin, 1884)
 A strange passion, a life for insects, ed.  The Pre Clerics, 1990
 Psychological function, ed.  Robert Laffont, 1991
 The conquerors blind, science threatens us does?, Ed.  Robert Laffont, 1992
 The new Golem, ed.  du Rocher, 1993
 Live from the afterlife (in collaboration with Father Francis Brown ), ed.  Robert Laffont, 1993
 The world of ants, ed.  du Rocher, 1994
 God's future, about a man of science, ed.  du Rocher, 1995
 Bird World, ed.  the Rock 1996
 Darwinism or the end of a myth, al.  "The Spirit and Matter", ed.  du Rocher, 1997
 Handbook of Psychophysiology, ed.  Masson, 1997
 Listening to the beyond (+ father F. Brown), ed.  Lebeaud, 1999 (fitness "Live from the Beyond")
 The devil in the font, ed.  du Rocher, 1999
 The riddle of the bees, ed.  du Rocher, 1999
 The man, monkey and bird, ed.  Odile Jacob, 2000
 The paranormal in the Third Millennium, ed.  JM Laffont – LPM, 2001
 The ball of bees, Volume 1, ed.  of Goral, 2001 (Cartoon, RC scenario, drawings by Patrice Serres
 The return of the magicians, the alarm of a scientist, ed.  JMG, 2002
 The ball of bees, Volume 2 "The fragrance of coffee," ed.  of Goral, 2002 (planned trilogy)

See also 
 Richard Milton
 Extrasensory perception
 Telepathy
 Paranormal
 Vitalism

References 

French entomologists
Parapsychologists
1913 births
2009 deaths
20th-century French zoologists